Greenbury is a surname and a given name, which may refer to:

Surname:
 Christopher Greenbury (1951–2007), British film editor
 Richard Greenbury (1936–2017), British businessman
 Robert Greenbury (1600–1650), English painter

Given name:
 Greenbury L. Fort (1825–1883), American politician, U.S. Representative from Illinois
 Greenbury Purnell (1794–1857), American railroad executive
 Greenbury Ridgely Henry (1828–1885), American founding member of Phi Alpha Literary Society

See also 
 The Greenbury Report (1995) on corporate governance
 Greenbury Point Light, the name of two lighthouses in Chesapeake Bay, United States
 Greenberry (disambiguation)
 Greensburg (disambiguation)
 Grünburg

English-language surnames
English given names